Michal Kvíčala (born 24 January 1981) is a Czech luger. He competed in the men's singles event at the 2002 Winter Olympics.

References

External links
 

1981 births
Living people
Czech male lugers
Olympic lugers of the Czech Republic
Lugers at the 2002 Winter Olympics
Sportspeople from Liberec